Matsumoto (written:  lit. "base of the pine tree") is the 15th most common Japanese surname. Notable people with the surname include:

, Japanese television personality and actress
, Japanese volleyball player
, Japanese footballer
Cazuo Matsumoto (born 1985), Brazilian table tennis player
, better known as Shoko Asahara, Japanese cult leader and founder of Aum Shinrikyo
, Japanese voice actor
, Japanese footballer
, Japanese footballer
, Japanese politician
David Matsumoto (born 1959), American psychologist, writer and judoka
, Japanese photographer
Elisabetta Matsumoto, American physicist
, Japanese politician
, Japanese actor
George Matsumoto (1922–2016), American architect and educator
, Japanese baseball player
, Japanese footballer
H. Matsumoto, Japanese set decorator
, Japanese activist
, Japanese kabuki actor
, Japanese kabuki actor
, Japanese snowboarder
, Japanese jazz saxophonist and bandleader
, better known as hide, Japanese musician
Hideya Matsumoto, Japanese mathematician
, Japanese violinist
, Japanese model
, Japanese engineer and atmospheric scientist
, Japanese actor
, Japanese footballer
, Japanese professional wrestler
, Japanese footballer
, Japanese swimmer
, Japanese comedian
, Japanese painter
, Japanese footballer and manager
, Japanese idol, singer, actress and television personality
, Japanese manga artist
, Japanese politician and businessman
, Japanese manga artist
, Japanese legal scholar and politician
Jon Matsumoto (born 1986), Canadian ice hockey player
, Japanese singer and actor
, Japanese politician
, Japanese physician
, Japanese judoka
, better known as Dump Matsumoto, Japanese professional wrestler
, Japanese cyclist
, Japanese swimmer
, Japanese illustrator and manga artist
, Imperial Japanese Navy admiral
, Japanese adult video director
, Japanese racing driver
, Japanese baseball player
, Japanese footballer
, Japanese footballer
, Japanese swimmer
Kiyo A. Matsumoto (born 1955), American judge
, Japanese baseball player
, Japanese footballer
, Japanese mathematician
, Japanese educationist
, Japanese kabuki actor
, Japanese kabuki actor
Lauren Matsumoto (born 1987), American politician and beauty pageant winner
, Japanese manga artist
Lisa Matsumoto (1964–2007), American playwright
, Japanese actress
Mark Matsumoto, American engineer
Matsumoto Masanobu, Japanese swordsman
, Japanese footballer
, Japanese psychologist
, Japanese badminton player
, Japanese voice actress
, Japanese photographer
, Japanese mixed martial artist
Mitsuo Matsumoto (born 1971), Japanese mixed martial artist
, Japanese voice actress
, Japanese professional wrestler and actress
, Japanese footballer
, Japanese weightlifter
Naoko Matsumoto, Japanese archaeologist
, Japanese softball player
, Japanese physician and geneticist
Nina Matsumoto (born 1984), Canadian cartoonist
, Japanese photographer
, Japanese businessman and inventor
, Japanese footballer
, Japanese anime director
, Japanese actress, voice actress and singer
, Japanese actress, model and singer
Roy Matsumoto (1914–2014), United States Army soldier
, Japanese footballer
, Japanese politician
, Japanese sport wrestler
, Japanese baseball player
, Japanese voice actress
Sayaka Matsumoto (born 1982), American judoka
, Japanese writer
, Japanese journalist
, Japanese sport wrestler
, Japanese footballer
, Japanese diplomat
, Japanese painter
, Japanese footballer
, Japanese manga artist
, better known as Tak Matsumoto, Japanese musician
, Japanese lyricist and musician
, Japanese poet
, Japanese footballer
, Japanese politician
, Japanese Go player
, Japanese footballer
, Japanese voice actress and actress
, Japanese manga artist and illustrator
, Japanese baseball player
, Japanese manga artist
Tortoise Matsumoto (born 1966), Japanese musician
 (born 1977), Japanese badminton player
, Japanese film director
, Japanese dancer and actor
, Japanese actor
, Japanese actress
, Japanese footballer
, Japanese actor and voice actor
, Japanese swimmer
, Japanese politician
, Japanese volleyball player
, Japanese shogi player
, Japanese footballer
, Brazilian baseball player
, Japanese information scientist
, Japanese footballer
, Japanese computer scientist, software programmer, writer and creator of the Ruby programming language
, Japanese table tennis player

Fictional characters
, a character in the manga series Nana
, a character in the manga series Case Closed
, a character in the manga series Bleach

References

Japanese-language surnames